The Craigkelly transmitting station is a broadcasting and telecommunications facility located at Craigkelly north of the Firth of Forth above the town of Burntisland in Fife, Scotland. It has a 125-metre tall free-standing lattice tower rebuilt from a lattice tower originally located at the Emley Moor transmitting station.

The station came into service in 1968 to improve coverage of BBC 2 to the Edinburgh area, which has a number of hills blocking good reception from Black Hill. In September 1971 it also started broadcasting BBC1 and Scottish Television on 625 lines in colour and though considered a 'main' station, it actually rebroadcast the signal from the Black Hill transmitting station, like a relay. Its tower now also carries antennas for many broadcasting and private radio organisations. This structure was previously used at Emley Moor.

The transmitter was originally an A group but has become a K group (or wideband) with the advent of Channel 5 and Digital. Craigkelly is one of the few main transmitters which did not return to its original group at DSO. However, when Craigkelly went through its 700 MHz clearance in October 2018 all of the main 6 MUXES returned to the A group, the only two out side are MUXES 7 and 8 (See Craigkelly's graph) which are due to be switched off between 2020 and 2022 anyway.

The tower can be clearly seen from many parts of Edinburgh across the Firth of Forth on its prominent position atop the hill known as The Binn.

Transmitted services

Analogue radio

Digital radio

Digital television

Before switchover

Analogue television
Analogue television transmissions ceased from Craigkelly on 15 June 2011.

See also
List of towers

References

External links
Craigkelly's entry at mb21
Info & pictures of Craigkelly including co-receivable transmitters
Multimap link
Craigkelly Transmitter at thebigtower.com
http://skyscraperpage.com/diagrams/?buildingID=109492

Transmitter sites in Scotland